HMCS Westmount (pennant J318) was a  that served with the Royal Canadian Navy during the Second World War. Entering service in 1942, the minesweeper spent the entire war on the Atlantic Canada coast. Following the war, the ship was laid up in reserve until reacquired in 1952 during the Korean War. Never re-entering service with the Royal Canadian Navy, the vessel was sold to the Turkish Navy in 1958. Renamed Bornova (also spelled Bor Nova), the minesweeper was discarded in 1972.

Design and description
They came in two versions powered by different engines; those with a diesel engines and those with vertical triple-expansion steam engines. Westmount was of the latter design and was larger than her diesel-engined cousins. She had a complement of 6 officers and 77 enlisted.

Westmount had two vertical triple-expansion steam engines, each driving one shaft, using steam provided by two Admiralty three-drum boilers.

Westmount was armed with a single quick-firing (QF) 12-pounder 12 cwt HA gun mounted forward. The ship was also fitted with a QF 2-pounder Mark VIII aft and were eventually fitted with single-mounted QF 20 mm Oerlikon guns on the bridge wings. Those ships assigned to convoy duty had two depth charge launchers and four chutes to deploy the 40 depth charges they carried. Westmount was equipped with LL and SA minesweeping gear to clear both magnetic and acoustic naval mines.

Operational history
The minesweeper was ordered as part of the 1941–1942 construction programme. The ship's keel was laid down on 28 October 1941 by Davie Shipbuilding at their yard in Lauzon, Quebec. Named for a community in Quebec, Westmount was launched on 14 March 1942. The ship was commissioned on 15 September 1942 at Toronto.

While working up off Pictou, Nova Scotia, the ship developed engine issues that kept her at Halifax, Nova Scotia from 20 November 1942 to 2 February 1943. Following the minesweeper's return to service, Westmount was assigned to Halifax Local Defence Force and then Halifax Force, the escort and patrol force based at Halifax. In May 1943, the ship transferred to Sydney Force, the escort and patrol group based at Sydney, Nova Scotia and remained with the unit until January 1944. That month, the minesweeper rejoined Halifax Force. Other than a refit at Lunenburg, Nova Scotia that took from February to April 1945, Westmount remained on the Atlantic Canada coast for the remainder of the war.

The minesweeper was paid off at Sydney on 23 October 1945 and laid up at Shelburne, Nova Scotia. Westmount was taken to Sorel, Quebec in 1946 and placed in strategic reserve. In 1951 the minesweeper was reacquired by the Royal Canadian Navy during the Korean War. The vessel was given the new hull number FSE 187 and re-designated a coastal escort. However, the ship never recommissioned and remained in reserve until 29 March 1958 when Westmount was formally transferred to the Turkish Navy. Renamed Bornova (also spelled Bor Nova) by the Turkish Navy, the vessel remained in service until 1972 when it was discarded. The vessel was broken up in Turkey in 1972.

References

Notes

Citations

Sources

External links
 

 

Bangor-class minesweepers of the Royal Canadian Navy
Ships built in Quebec
1942 ships
World War II minesweepers of Canada